Let's run it up the flagpole and see if anyone salutes it is a catchphrase which became popular in the United States during the late 1950s and early 1960s. It means "to present an idea tentatively and see whether it receives a favorable reaction." It is now considered a cliché. Sometimes it is used seriously, but more often it is used humorously, with the intention that it be recognized as both hackneyed and outdated. A non-joking equivalent would be "to send up a trial balloon."

The phrase was associated with the advertising agencies then located on Madison Avenue in New York, and with the "men in the grey flannel suits". Comedians, when mocking corporate culture, were certain to use it, along with expressions such as the whole ball of wax and the use of invented words ending in -wise (e.g. "We've had a good year, revenuewise").

The phrase was also used as an ice breaker between serious moments in the motion picture 12 Angry Men starring Henry Fonda. The line was delivered by Juror no. 12, an advertising executive played by Robert Webber.

In Stan Freberg's 1961 comedy album, Stan Freberg Presents the United States of America Volume One: The Early Years, General George Washington, after having just received the nation's new flag from seamstress Betsy Ross, announces that he'll just "run it up the flagpole... see if anyone salutes."

Allan Sherman captured the essence of this meme in his 1963 parody of Gilbert and Sullivan's "When I Was a Lad". In Sherman's lyrics, the narrator joins an advertising firm:

The group Harvey Danger used the phrase in their song "Flagpole Sitta":

As it became hackneyed, it got a second life as a launching point for the invention of joking variations, such as "Let's drop it in the pool and see if it makes a splash", "Let's throw it against the wall and see if it sticks", "Let's put it in a saucer and see if the cat licks it up", and "Let's put it on the five-fifteen and see if it gets off at Westport" (i.e.,  let's put it on a New York City commuter train and find out whether it is destined for Westport, Connecticut, a town thought to be the home of many successful executives).

See also
 Trial balloon

References

English phrases